Swingin' is a jazz album by Arturo Sandoval released in 1996.

The album focuses on swing rhythms instead of Latin music. The album has been cited as "one of Arturo Sandoval's finest recordings," and a "nice addition to the Sandoval library", but classic Sandoval rather than attempting anything too innovative. The line up features clarinetist Eddie Daniels, tenorists Michael Brecker and Ed Calle, trombonist Dana Teboe and guitarist Mike Stern.

Track listing
"Moontrane" 
"Swingin'" 
"Moment's Notice"
"Streets of Desire" 
"Real McBop" 
"Weird-fun"
"Dizzy's Atmosphere"
"Reflection"
"Woody"
"It Never Gets Old"
"Mack the Knife"

References

1996 albums
Arturo Sandoval albums